Mogau Trinity Tshehla (25 January 1992 – 12 February 2018) was a South African professional footballer who played at right back for Witbank Spurs and Polokwane City.

Tshehla was killed in an automobile accident on 12 February 2018.

References

1992 births
2018 deaths
South African soccer players
Witbank Spurs F.C. players
Polokwane City F.C. players
National First Division players
South African Premier Division players
Association football fullbacks
Road incident deaths in South Africa